Allobosca is a genus of biting flies in the family of louse flies, Hippoboscidae. There is only one known species, Allobosca crassipes Speiser, 1899. It is a parasite of lemurs. It has only rudimentary wings.

Distribution 
It is only found in Madagascar.

Hosts 
Black lemur (Eulemur macaco), red-bellied lemur (Eulemur rubriventer), weasel sportive lemur (Lepilemur mustelinus), eastern woolly lemur (Avahi laniger), diademed sifaka (Propithecus diadema).

References 

Parasitic flies
Parasites of primates
Hippoboscidae
Monotypic Brachycera genera
Hippoboscoidea genera
Taxa named by Paul Gustav Eduard Speiser